Silver Arrows was the nickname given by the press to Germany's dominant Mercedes-Benz and Auto Union Grand Prix motor racing cars between 1934 and 1939. The name was later applied to the Mercedes-Benz Formula One and sports cars in 1954 and 1955, then to the Group C prototype racing sports cars that were successful at the Le Mans in the late 1980's, and currently applied to the Mercedes AMG Petronas Formula One Team cars from 2010 to present.

For decades until the introduction of sponsorship liveries, each country had its traditional colour in automobile racing. German race cars for their Silver Arrows silver, Italian for their Rosso Corsa red, British ones are British racing green green, French Bleu de France blue, etc.

German cars like the Blitzen Benz were white, as were the three Mercedes that won the 1914 French Grand Prix 1–2–3. On the other hand, Mercedes won the Italian Targa Florio with cars painted red in 1922 (Giulio Masetti) and 1924 (Christian Werner), blending in with the local competitors. The big supercharged 200 hp Mercedes-Benz SSKL with which Rudolf Caracciola won the 1931 Mille Miglia was called the White Elephant.

Origin of the name
In 1958, Alfred Neubauer described the origin of the Silver Arrows as being accidental. Neubauer said that when in spring 1934, the Mercedes-Benz team placed its new Mercedes-Benz W25 on the scrutineering scales prior to the Eifelrennen at the Nürburgring, it allegedly recorded . Racing manager Alfred Neubauer and his driver Manfred von Brauchitsch, who both later published their memoirs, claimed that they had the idea of removing all the white lead-based paint from the bodywork. The story continues that the next day the shining silver aluminium beneath was exposed and scrutineering was passed. After the  car of Von Brauchitsch won the race, the nickname Silver Arrow was born, according to this version.

There is however, controversy and doubt regarding this story. It did not appear until 1958, and no reference to it has been found in contemporary sources. It has since been established that von Brauchitsch had raced a streamlined silver SSKL on the AVUS in 1932, which was called a Silver Arrow in live radio coverage. Also, in 1934, both Mercedes and Auto Union had entered the Avusrennen with silver cars. The next big event was the 1934 Eifelrennen, but as few cars complying to the new rules were ready, it was held for Formule Libre, so weight was still not a race-critical issue at that time. By the 1930s, modern stressed-skin aircraft fuselage construction was already using polished and unpainted aluminium panels for streamlining and to save weight. Neubauer's 1958 autobiography has been shown to include several embellished stories and dubious claims, including a fabricated hoax surrounding the 1933 Tripoli Grand Prix, where he falsely accused several drivers of "fixing" the race.

A historical connection to the Neubauer's story appeared in 2023 with the introduction of the Mercedes-AMG F1 W14 E Performance Formula One car. At the launch, held on 15 February 2023, the W14 was revealed to have a black livery, much like its predecessors, the Mercedes F1 W11 of 2020 and the W12 of 2021, but unlike those aforementioned cars, the black livery on the car is not being primarily used to promote diversity, but to save weight after the team admitted to struggling with excess weight with its 2022 car, the W13, which had a traditional silver-painted livery. The black colour was created by leaving most of the parts as unpainted raw carbon whilst some others (mainly the top of the nose and the engine cover) are painted with matte black paint.

Performance

By 1937, the supercharged engine of a Mercedes-Benz W125 attained an output of 646 hp (475 kW), a figure not greatly exceeded in Grand Prix Racing until the early 1980s, when turbo-charged engines were common in Formula One – although it was at least matched as early as the late 1940s by conventionally fuelled Grand Prix engines like the BRM V16, despite the rules restricting later engines to half the cylinder capacity.

The superiority of these vehicles in international motor racing established the term "Silver Arrow" as a legend, for example by usually winning the first race in which they were entered. The names Rudolf Caracciola, Bernd Rosemeyer, Hermann Lang, and later Stirling Moss and Juan Manuel Fangio, will always be associated with the eras of these racing cars.

Mercedes-Benz recalled its great past in the 1970s with rally cars, and in the 1980s with the Sauber sportscars and DTM touring cars.  As well as the 2010 return to F1 racing of AMG-Petronas cars, dominant there since 2014.

Other car companies

Now a traditional colour for road-cars in reference to the Silver Arrows, most German car companies have a shade of silver in their catalogues conforming to Silberpfeil-Grau, or Silver Arrow Grey.

However, Audi and Mercedes-Benz are not the only German car companies who paint their cars in a silver colour. Porsche has also inherited the tradition of silver arrows. However, BMW still paints its cars in the traditional white colour.

At the 1999 Le Mans 24 Hours, a total of seven "Silver Arrows" were entered in the Le Mans Prototype class:
three Mercedes-Benz CLR
two British-built LM-GT1 Audi R8C
two Joest Racing LMP Audi R8R that scored third and fourth.

Mercedes-AMG Petronas Formula One Team (2010–present)
In , with the formation of Mercedes GP Petronas F1 Team, Mercedes-Benz returned to Grand Prix racing as a constructor. Mercedes' cars have been nicknamed "Silver Arrows" by the press and by the team itself. The modern cars race with the majority of their bodies painted in a traditional silver shade, trimmed in Petronas green.

In 2010, team principal Ross Brawn introduced the team's first cars as the new Silver Arrows, with Germans Nico Rosberg and 7-time world champion Michael Schumacher driving the Mercedes MGP W01. In , Rosberg drove the Mercedes F1 W03 to victory at the Chinese Grand Prix to claim Mercedes' first victory in Formula One since 1955.

Mercedes'  Formula One car, the Mercedes F1 W05 Hybrid (with drivers Lewis Hamilton and Nico Rosberg) began one of the more dominant periods by a constructor in the sport's history. The Silver Arrows won (and led every lap of) the first seven races of the 2014 season, only falling due to a KERS failure on both cars in the 2014 Canadian Grand Prix. Overall, the cars achieved 18 pole positions, 16 wins and eleven 1–2 finishes in the 19-race season. Mercedes won the 2014 Formula One Constructors' Championship (their first) while Hamilton won the 2014 Drivers' Championship.

In the  season, the W06 Hybrid continued Mercedes' dominance of the turbo-charged hybrid-engine era, attaining 18 pole positions and 16 wins along with twelve 1–2 finishes. Mercedes achieved 23 consecutive pole positions from the 2014 British Grand Prix to the 2015 Italian Grand Prix. Both cars finished on the podium in each event in 2015 with the exception of the 2015 Hungarian Grand Prix. The race marked the first time both cars were left off the podium since the 2013 Brazilian Grand Prix. On 11 October 2015 at the Russian Grand Prix, Mercedes won their second consecutive Constructors' Championship. Later that year Lewis Hamilton won his third Drivers' Championship and his second consecutive championship with Mercedes.

In the  season with the W07 Hybrid, Mercedes won the Constructors' Championship for the third consecutive season. The team amassed a total of 20 pole positions and 14 front-row lockouts for the season. They won 19 of the 21 races held with eight 1–2 finishes and finished the year with 765 points (297 points ahead of the second place constructor Red Bull). Nico Rosberg won his first and only Drivers' Championship, finishing five points ahead of teammate Lewis Hamilton. Rosberg announced his retirement five days after winning the title.

Former Williams driver Valtteri Bottas joined Hamilton for the  season as drivers of the Mercedes AMG F1 W08 EQ Power+. In most of the early races, Mercedes was strongly challenged, and at times beaten, by the much-improved Ferrari team's SF70H car. Ferrari's Sebastian Vettel led the Drivers' Championship for most of the season. Ultimately Mercedes' strong second half of the season earned them their fourth consecutive Constructors' Championship while Hamilton won his fourth Drivers' Championship. The 2017 Silver Arrows took 15 pole positions, 12 wins and four 1–2 finishes in the 20 races held.

During most of the  season, Mercedes was again strongly challenged by Ferrari (SF71H) and at times, Red Bull's RB14. Through the first half of the season, the three teams were virtually sharing victories. Ferrari had four wins, while Mercedes and Red Bull each had three wins after 10 races. Mercedes trailed Ferrari by 20 points after the 2018 British Grand Prix. Once again (this year with the W09 EQ Power+) Mercedes put together a very successful second half of the season to claim their fifth consecutive Constructors' Championship. Hamilton won his fifth Drivers' Championship, his fourth with Mercedes in the previous five years. Overall the team won 11 of the 21 races, with four 1–2 finishes and 13 poles.

Mercedes started the  season with huge successes as they finished 1–2 in the first five races of the season and won the first eight. For the season Mercedes won 15 of the 21 races including nine 1–2 finishes and 32 podiums on their way to their sixth consecutive Constructors' Championship. Drivers Lewis Hamilton and Valtteri Bottas in the AMG F1 W10 EQ Power+ also achieved 10 poles and 9 fastest laps. Hamilton won his sixth Drivers' Championship, his fifth with Mercedes. The team has won both the Drivers' Championship and the Constructors' Championship 
in each and every year from 2014 to 2019 and are the only Formula One team in history to win six consecutive such "double-championships".

For the 2019 German Grand Prix at Hockenheim the cars raced in a special livery honouring the origins of their silver colour and to also celebrate the team's 200th start in F1. The cars were painted in such a way to pay homage to the story of the white paint being peeled away, exposing the shiny silver underneath.

For the  season, while originally going to use a silver livery as usual, Mercedes decided to switch to an all-black livery, following the growing worldwide support for the Black Lives Matter movement, and the postponement of the season. Hamilton prompted the livery change, saying he wanted the team to show its support for the cause through more than just social media posts, which led to the idea to adopt a new livery and launch a drive to improve diversity within the team. The team would continue to use a black livery going into .

References

Further reading

NB: For sources specifically about Auto Union Silver Arrows, see Auto Union racing cars. For sources specifically about Mercedes-Benz Silver Arrows, see Mercedes-Benz in motorsport.

 
 
 
 
 
 
 
 
 
 
 </ref>

External links
Grand Prix History , Die Silberpfeile
The Silver Arrows
The Silver Arrows 75th Anniversary, Carsguide Historical article

Mercedes-Benz racing cars
Formula One cars
Grand Prix cars
Nicknames in sports